Yasavol (also Romanized as Yasāvol; also known as Yesgūl) is a village in Esfandan Rural District, in the Central District of Komijan County, Markazi Province, Iran. At the 2006 census, its population was 386, in 103 families.

References 

Populated places in Komijan County